The Black River is a river in the municipality of Sioux Narrows-Nestor Falls, Kenora District in Northwestern Ontario, Canada. It is part of the Hudson Bay drainage basin, and is a tributary of the Lake of the Woods.

Course
The river begins at an unnamed lake in geographic Work Township and heads southwest through Ulster Lake and under Ontario Highway 71 to Black Lake. It continues southwest, passes into geographic MacQuarrie Township then Yellow Girl Bay 32B Indian Reserve (part of the Naotkamegwanning First Nation), and reaches its mouth at Long Bay on the northeast side of the Lake of the Woods. The Lake of the Woods flows via the Winnipeg River and the Nelson River to Hudson Bay.

Tributaries
Graphic Creek (right)
Johnny Creek (left)

See also
List of rivers of Ontario

References

Other external map sources

Rivers of Kenora District
Tributaries of Hudson Bay